Melissa (Mel) Bragg (born 17 December 1994) is an Australian netball and AFL Women's player for the Geelong Football Club. 

She has previously played in the Suncorp Super Netball league for the Collingwood Magpies.

Netball career
Bragg's elite-level netball career commenced in 2015, when she played for the Victorian Fury team in the Australian Netball League. She moved to the Collingwood Magpies as a training partner in 2018 and played for Tasmanian Magpies, though she made her debut for the Magpies at Super Netball level in the 2018 regular season against the New South Wales Swifts. From 2018 to 2019, Bragg made four Super Netball appearances as a training partner, and she was elevated to the Magpies' senior list ahead of the 2020 season.

Australian rules football career

Bragg switched to playing Australian rules football in 2022, playing in the 2022 VFL Women's season with Geelong. She was later added to Geelong's AFL Women's squad for AFL Women's season seven.

References

External links
 
 Magpies Netball profile
 Netball Draft Central profile

1994 births
Australian netball players
Collingwood Magpies Netball players
Living people
Victorian Netball League players
Australian Netball League players
Victorian Fury players
Tasmanian Magpies players
Netball players from Melbourne
Geelong Football Club (AFLW) players
People from Werribee, Victoria